Štrba railway station is a break-of-gauge junction station serving the village of Štrba, in the Prešov Region, northeastern Slovakia.

The station forms part of the standard gauge Košice–Bohumín Railway (KBD), and is the highest point on that line. It is also the junction between the KBD and the Štrbské Pleso – Štrba rack railway, a metre gauge line of which it is the valley terminus. As such, the station is a gateway to the High Tatras mountain range, a popular tourist destination.

The station is currently owned by Železnice Slovenskej republiky (ŽSR); train services are operated by Železničná spoločnosť Slovensko (ZSSK).

Location

History
It became a junction when the rack railway opened in 1896.

Although the rack railway was closed in 1932 and lifted soon afterwards, it was reconstructed at the end of the 1960s, and reopened in 1970 in time for that year's FIS Nordic World Ski Championships.

Facilities
The three storey station building houses information and ticketing facilities, and a restaurant.

The standard gauge station yard has tracks equipped with low level platforms for passenger services, and tracks for freight workings and the stabling of rolling stock.

The current rack railway terminus is in an upper section of the station dating from the reconstruction of the rack railway in 1970.

Train services
Štrba railway station is the junction of the following Slovakian railway lines:

 180 Košice–Žilina (part of the Košice–Bohumín Railway)
  Štrba–Štrbské Pleso

Line 180 forms part of Slovakia's main east–west rail corridor, and is also part of Pan-European Corridor Va, which runs from Venice in Italy to Kyiv in Ukraine, via Bratislava, Žilina, Košice and Uzhhorod.

Interchange
The station offers interchange with local buses.

Services

See also

History of rail transport in Slovakia
Rail transport in Slovakia

References

External links

 Štrba railway station on vlaky.net 

Railway stations in Prešov Region
Railway stations opened in 1871
Railway stations in Slovakia opened in the 19th century